The thirty-ninth season of Saturday Night Live, an American sketch comedy series, originally aired in the United States on NBC from September 28, 2013 until May 17, 2014 with 21 episodes.

Cast
At the end of the previous season, longtime cast members Fred Armisen, Jason Sudeikis, and Bill Hader decided not to return for the next season after spending their respective eleven, nine, and eight seasons on the show. Soon after their departures, featured player Tim Robinson, who had been a cast member the previous season, decided to instead join the show's writing staff before this season began; this would be Robinson's last season overall on the show, as he departed following the finale. Aidy Bryant, Kate McKinnon, and Cecily Strong were all promoted to repertory status.

Following Armisen, Sudeikis, Hader, and Robinson's departures from the cast, the show hired six new featured players, including SNL staff writer Mike O'Brien, who was promoted into the cast while also continuing as a writer. Besides O'Brien, the other new hires at the start of the season were Beck Bennett and Kyle Mooney of the sketch comedy group Good Neighbor, John Milhiser of the sketch group Serious Lunch, comedian Noël Wells (known for her viral videos and impressions featured on sites such as Cracked.com), and stand-up comedian Brooks Wheelan. Midway through the season, the show also added a seventh featured player: Upright Citizens Brigade performer Sasheer Zamata. Zamata became the first black female cast member on the show since biracial Maya Rudolph's departure from the show in 2007.

On May 12, 2013, NBC announced that Weekend Update anchor Seth Meyers would be the new host of Late Night in 2014, succeeding SNL alum Jimmy Fallon, as Fallon was taking over as the new host of The Tonight Show. Meyers remained Weekend Update anchor up until his departure from the show on February 1, 2014. Cecily Strong, who had been upgraded to repertory status for this season, was brought up to co-anchor with Meyers. After Meyers' departure, Colin Jost, a staff writer for the show since 2005 (and head writer for season 38 and 39), joined the cast on March 1, 2014, as the eighth featured player that season, and as Meyers' successor on Weekend Update, co-anchoring with Strong.

The addition of eight new cast members is the greatest since the 1995–96 season, during which nine cast members were added, making it the largest cast overhaul in eighteen years. The total of 17 cast members was an SNL record at the time, and some critics argued that the large cast contributed to how uneven the season was overall. 

This would be the final season for longtime cast member Nasim Pedrad, who had been on the show for five seasons since 2009. Pedrad announced her departure from the show in June 2014 in order to work on the Lorne Michaels-produced sitcom Mulaney. Additionally, featured players John Milhiser, Noël Wells, and Brooks Wheelan were all fired from the show after one season, and their fellow featured player Mike O'Brien returned to the writers' room for the next season, which would be his last overall after spending six seasons on the show since 2009.

This would also be the final season for longtime announcer Don Pardo, who died on August 18, 2014, at the age of 96.

Cast roster

Repertory players
 Vanessa Bayer 
 Aidy Bryant
 Taran Killam 
 Kate McKinnon 
 Seth Meyers  (final episode: February 1, 2014)
 Bobby Moynihan 
 Nasim Pedrad 
 Jay Pharoah 
 Cecily Strong
 Kenan Thompson 

Featured players
 Beck Bennett
 Colin Jost  (first episode: March 1, 2014)
 John Milhiser 
 Kyle Mooney 
 Mike O'Brien 
 Noël Wells
 Brooks Wheelan
 Sasheer Zamata  (first episode: January 18, 2014) 

bold denotes Weekend Update anchors

Controversy
During the season, the show came under criticism from critics (as well as African-American cast members Kenan Thompson and Jay Pharoah) for not including at least one black female cast member, a topic that was addressed on the November 2, 2013, show hosted by Kerry Washington. As a result, Lorne Michaels announced that the show would be holding auditions for a black female cast member, expected to join the show in January as a new featured player. On January 6, 2014, it was announced that UCB-NY performer Sasheer Zamata would be joining the cast as a featured player. She made her first appearance on January 18, 2014.

Writers

For the first half of the season, Seth Meyers, Colin Jost and Rob Klein were co-head writers. After Meyers' departure, Bryan Tucker replaced him as a co-head writer.

Prior to the start of the season, three new writers were hired:
Claire Mulaney, younger sister of former writer John Mulaney
Mikey Day, a member of The Groundlings and cast member on MTV's Wild 'N Out
Michael Che, a standup comic who had guest written for five episodes in season 38, was hired as a full-time writer.
Additionally, Tim Robinson was moved to the writing staff after one year as a featured player on the show.

In December, Chicago Second City alum Katie Rich joined the writing staff.

In January, comedians LaKendra Tookes and Leslie Jones were added to the writing staff. Both were part of the December casting call for a black female cast member.

This was Seth Meyers' final season as writer. Michael Che initially departed following this season to join The Daily Show as a correspondent, but returned for the start of the next season to co-anchor Weekend Update alongside Jost.

This was also the final season for longtime writers Alex Baze (Weekend Update writer since 2004, and head of the segment since 2011), Marika Sawyer and John Solomon (both of whom had been with the show since 2006), as well as the only season for LaKendra Tookes.

Episodes

Specials

References

39
Saturday Night Live in the 2010s
2013 American television seasons
2014 American television seasons
Television shows directed by Don Roy King